Avantika Bawa (born 1973) is an Indian American artist, curator, and professor of art. Bawa is a multidisciplinary artist who works primarily in site-specific installation, video, printmaking, and drawing. She is the recipient of the 2018 Crow's Shadow Institute of the Arts Golden Spot Residency Award, the Hallie Ford Fellowship in the Visual Arts, and the Oregon Arts Commission Joan Shipley Award.

Education 

Bawa has an MFA in painting from the School of the Art Institute of Chicago and a BFA from the Maharaja Sayajirao University.

Career 

Bawa is an associate professor of art at Washington State University Vancouver, and serves on the board of the Oregon Arts Commission. She has had solo exhibitions at the Portland Art Museum in Portland, Oregon, Suyama Space in Seattle; Saltworks Gallery in Atlanta; Disjecta Contemporary Arts Center in Portland, Oregon; and Gallery Maskara in Mumbai, India.

Bawa is also one of the founders of Drain - A Journal of Contemporary Art and Culture, an online journal that explores creative perspectives on contemporary culture. In 2019, she was commissioned to make a game day poster for the Portland Trail Blazers January 9 game against the Chicago Bulls.

Work

Themes 
Bawa's work responds to and incorporates architectural spaces and styles. She draws from  Minimalism and Abstraction for inspiration. Her work for Disjecta Art Center's 2016 Portland Biennial was installed in the vacant Astor Hotel in Astoria, Oregon. Bawa created a large golden scaffold that was accompanied by audio recordings of construction.

Exhibitions 
In 2018, Bawa had a solo exhibition of drawings and prints of the Portland Veterans Memorial Coliseum at the Portland Art Museum, as part of the APEX series curated by Grace Kook-Anderson. She also had a concurrent exhibition at Ampersand Gallery that culminated in the publication of an artist's book. In 2017 she exhibited Parallel Faults at Los Angeles Valley College in Valley Glen, California Her work was included in the 2016 Portland Biennial, curated by Michelle Grabner. Between 2014 and 2015, Bawa showed her project Aqua Mapping in the Whitebox Gallery in Portland, Oregon and Saltworks Gallery in Atlanta, Georgia. In 2012, Bawa exhibited a large scale, site-specific installation called At Owner's Risk at Suyama Space in Seattle, Washington, that responded to the current and historical uses of the space: an architecture firm, an auto body shop, and a livery stable. In 2009, her show Mathesis: dub, dub dub, was exhibited at Gallery Maskara, in Mumbai, India

Personal life
Bawa was born in Ootacamund, India. She lives and works in Portland, Oregon, also frequently spending time in New Delhi.

References

1973 births
Living people
Indian emigrants to the United States
Artists from Portland, Oregon
Maharaja Sayajirao University of Baroda alumni
School of the Art Institute of Chicago alumni
American women artists of Indian descent
People from Ooty
21st-century American women